Neokochia americana (syn. Bassia americana, Kochia americana) is a species of flowering plant in the amaranth family, subfamily Camphorosmoideae, known by the common name green molly.

Description
Neokochia americana is a squat dwarf shrub growing many sprawling, mostly unbranched stems to a maximum height near 40 centimeters. The stems are covered in small, fleshy, knobby leaves less than 2 centimeters long. The stems and foliage are sometimes slightly hairy. Leaf anatomy is of the "C3 Neokochia americana type" with a thick-walled aqueous tissue. White-woolly flowers appear singly or in small clusters. The fruiting perianth is 5-winged.

Distribution
Neokochia americana is native to the western United States from California to Montana to Texas, where it grows in dry, alkaline soils such as alkali flats and desert washes.
A closely related species is Neokochia californica.

References

External links
Jepson Manual Treatment
USDA Plants Profile
Flora of North America

americana
Plants described in 1874